Sir Michael Niko Jones  (born 8 April 1965) is a New Zealand former rugby union player and coach.

Jones was a member of the Auckland team which dominated New Zealand rugby in the late 1980s and 1990s, and the Auckland Blues team which won the first two Super 12 championships, in 1996 and 1997.

He played once for Western Samoa, and 55 times for New Zealand, including winning the first Rugby World Cup in 1987. He was known for his Christian beliefs, which meant he chose not to play on Sundays. He was named by Rugby World magazine as the third best All Black of the 20th century after Colin Meads and Sean Fitzpatrick. John Hart, who first selected him for Auckland, called him "almost the perfect rugby player".

After retiring as a player, he served as coach of Samoa from 2004 to 2007. He was knighted in 2017 for services to the Pacific community and youth.

Early years
Jones was born in Auckland, New Zealand, and grew up in Te Atatū South, a suburb in the west of Auckland, attending Edmonton Primary, Rangeview Intermediate and Henderson High School. His talent for playing was discovered early, as a 10-year-old tackling 15 to 18 year-olds at the weekend kick-abouts at the primary school. He played for the primary school team when still in standard one, when he was three years younger than the other players and by the time he attended Henderson High School, he was already well known locally. He then helped turn a mediocre high school first XV into a successful rugby team that could compete with Auckland Grammar and Kelston Boys High (the regional heavyweights) for the first time. He played for the local Waitemata Rugby Club and it wasn't long before the Auckland representative team (coached by John Hart) took notice.

Playing career
Jones played initially as an open side flanker, and made his provincial debut for Auckland aged 20 in the 1985 National Provincial Championship, scoring three tries against South Canterbury. He also played for New Zealand Colts.
He made his international debut for Western Samoa, for whom he qualified through his mother, in 1986. After one cap for Samoa, and a British tour with the New Zealand Barbarians in 1987, he first played for New Zealand in the first game of the inaugural World Cup in the same year. He scored the second try of the tournament and played in four games, including the final, as New Zealand went on to win the competition.

Jones's career was blighted by injuries, notably two serious knee injuries (in 1989 and 1997) and a broken jaw in 1993. Due to this he only played 55 international games during a period when New Zealand played almost 90 internationals, even though he was usually first choice whenever fit.

His international career was also affected by his strong Christian beliefs, as he refused to play on Sundays. Although he was selected for the 1987 and 1991 All Black World Cup squads, he missed three Sunday games in the 1991 tournament due to his religious beliefs. Jones was omitted from the 1995 squad as he would have been unavailable for the quarterfinal and semifinal games. He was once asked how a Christian such as himself could be such an uncompromising tackler. In reply he quoted a phrase from the Bible: it's better to give than to receive.

Jones was a member of the successful Auckland and Auckland Blues teams which dominated New Zealand rugby in the late 1980s and 1990s. Between 1985 and 1999 Auckland won 9 NPC titles, 5 Super 6 championships, and defended the Ranfurly Shield a record 61 consecutive times (between 1985 and 1993), while the Blues won the first two Super 12 competitions in 1996 and 1997. In 1997 he succeeded Zinzan Brooke as captain of Auckland and the Blues. Due to his sporting successes, Jones was one of the most recognisable Samoan New Zealanders figures in the country in the 1980s.

He was an outstanding openside flanker, and scored 13 international tries. Later in his career, and after his injuries had reduced the speed which characterised his early career, he played predominantly as a blindside flanker or number eight. In 1998 he was dropped from the New Zealand team at the age of 33 after a loss over Australia and retired at the end of the 1999 season.

Coaching career
On 7 April 2004 Jones was appointed national coach of Samoa, replacing New Zealander John Boe. He had previously served as Boe's assistant coach during the 2003 World Cup. In 2007, just after the players flew out to New Zealand to prepare for their tour of South Africa, there was speculation that Jones had resigned as coach. However, after talks with the Manu Samoa Union over whether his role should become full-time until the World Cup, Jones joined the team on tour.

After rugby
Since 2002, he has been Village Trust food bank manager in Avondale, Auckland. Due to demands of the food bank, he declined invitations to be enlisted for Match Fit series in 2020 and 2021/22, but made an appearance in 2020.

Personal life
Jones graduated from the University of Auckland with three degrees: a Bachelor of Arts, Master of Arts, and Bachelor of Planning.

Jones and his wife Maliena have three children.

Awards
Jones was awarded the New Zealand 1990 Commemoration Medal, for service to the Pacific Island community.

In the 1997 New Year Honours, Jones was appointed a Member of the New Zealand Order of Merit (MNZM), for services to rugby. In 2003, he was inducted into the International Rugby Hall of Fame.
He was promoted to Knight Companion of the New Zealand Order of Merit (KNZM) in the 2017 Queen's Birthday Honours, for services to the Pacific community and youth.

Jones has been given the matai title (Samoan chiefly title) of La'auli and Savae from his ‘aiga (extended family).

Honours

Auckland
 National Provincial Championships: 1985, 1987, 1988, 1989, 1990, 1993, 1994, 1995, 1996, 1999
 Ranfurly Shield holder

Auckland Blues
 Super 12 champion: 1996, 1997

New Zealand
 Rugby World Cup winner: 1987
 Tri-Nations winner: 1996, 1997

References

External links

Waitemata Rugby Club

1965 births
New Zealand rugby union players
New Zealand rugby union coaches
New Zealand sportspeople of Samoan descent
New Zealand international rugby union players
Samoa international rugby union players
World Rugby Hall of Fame inductees
Auckland rugby union players
Blues (Super Rugby) players
Rugby union flankers
University of Auckland alumni
Rugby union players from Auckland
Knights Companion of the New Zealand Order of Merit
Living people
People educated at Henderson High School, Auckland
Rugby players and officials awarded knighthoods
New Zealand Christians
Samoa national rugby union team coaches